A spur is a metal instrument fastened to the heel of a horse rider.

Spur or Spurs may also refer to:

Medicine
 Bone spurs, a skeletal disorder forming small bony outgrowth along joint margins
 Heel spur, a thin spike of calcification in the human foot

Organizations 
 San Francisco Bay Area Planning and Urban Research Association, a non-profit research, education, and advocacy organization
 Gruppe SPUR, a German artistic collaboration, and their journal of the same name
 Spur Steak Ranches, a chain of steakhouses in South Africa
 Spur gas, North American gas stations operated by Murphy Oil

Routes
 Spur line, a short railway (railroad) branching from a main line
 Spur route, a short road branching from longer, more important route
 Spur trail, a shorter trail which branches from a longer route

Science
 Spur (botany), an elongated appendage of certain sepals
 Spur (geology), a ridge, often one that is subordinate to a larger ridge
 Interlocking spur, one of any number of ridges extending alternately from the opposite sides of the wall of a young, V-shaped valley
 Spur (stem), a short flower- and fruit-bearing stem on some fruit trees
 Spur (zoology), an outgrowth of bone covered in a sheath of horn
 Spur (chemistry), a region of high concentration of reaction product

Sports 
 Witbank Spurs, an association football club from South Africa
 Tottenham Hotspur F.C., a football team based in London, England
 San Antonio Spurs, a National Basketball Association team based in San Antonio, Texas, US
 Spurs Sports & Entertainment, the company that owns the San Antonio Spurs and other sports-related assets
 Chancellor's Spurs, a traveling trophy awarded to the winner of the college football game between Texas Tech University and the University of Texas at Austin

Other uses 
 Spur (architecture), the ornament carved on the angles of the bases of early columns
 Spur (horse), an American thoroughbred racehorse
 Spur (lunar crater)
 "Spurs" (short story), a short story by Tod Robbins that served as the basis of the film Freaks
 Spur (topography), a mountain ridge projecting laterally from a main mountain or mountain range
 Spur (typography), a small continuation of part of a printed letter, especially an uppercase G
 Spur (vine), one-year-old wood of a grapevine that is pruned back to leave just one or two buds to be used for next year's crop of grapes
 Spur, Texas, United States
 Spur Award, an annual literary prize awarded by the Western Writers of America
 Spur Gasoline Station, a historic building in Cynthiana, kentucky 
 Spur gear, a type of gear
 SPURS National Honor Society, a collegiate sophomore honor-service society in the United States
 Spurious tone or spur, a tone in an electronic circuit which interferes with a signal
 The Spur, a collection of Arts and Crafts bungalows in Clifton, Christchurch, New Zealand
 The Spurs, a Canadian country music group 1999–2000
 Truncated spur

See also
 Spurr (disambiguation)
 Spurt (disambiguation)